Roozbeh Hospital is the oldest psychiatric hospital in Iran, which is a subset of Tehran University of Medical Sciences.

Reference

External links
Tehran University of Medical Sciences
Article on Persian Wikipedia
Location of Roozbeh Hospital

Hospitals in Iran
Buildings and structures in Tehran
1947 establishments in Iran
Hospitals established in 1947